Gaetano Carrieri (born 10 March 1988) is an Italian footballer who plays for ASD Grumentum Val d'Agri.

Biography
Born in Taranto, Apulia, Carrieri started his senior career at amateur level. In 2008, Carrieri was signed by his first fully professional club Livorno and farmed to Manfredonia in co-ownership deal, which Livorno gave up the 50% registration rights in June 2009. Carrieri played 23 games in his second season in the fourth division. On 10 August 2010 he was signed by Italian Serie B club Torino as free agent in 3-year contract. He only played once, on 4 September 2010 against F.C. Crotone. On 31 January 2011 Carrieri left for the third division club Nocerina in temporary deal. On 17 June 2011 Carrieri was a piece-weight to sign Osarimen Ebagua in co-ownership deal. Half of Carrieri "card" was valued €200,000 and half of Ebagua €1.4 million. In June 2012 Torino gave up the remain 50% registration rights to Varese and Varese also bought back Ebagua. Torino also signed Riccardo Fiamozzi from Varese as compensation in the same month.

In 2012–13 Serie B season, Carrieri changed his shirt number from 36 to 6, and finally made his club debut in competitive game, on 13 August 2012 the first round of the cup.

References

External links
 Lega Serie B Profile 
 AIC.Football.it Profile 
 
 

Italian footballers
Manfredonia Calcio players
Torino F.C. players
S.S.D. Varese Calcio players
A.S.G. Nocerina players
Cosenza Calcio players
Fermana F.C. players
Serie B players
Serie C players
Serie D players
Association football defenders
Sportspeople from Taranto
Living people
1988 births